David G. Hey (18 July 1938 – 14 February 2016) was an English historian, and was an authority on surnames and the local history of Yorkshire. Hey was the president of the British Association for Local History, and was a published author of several books on local history and the derivation of surnames.

Early life
Hey was born to George and Florence (née Batty) Hey in Catshaw. When he was eleven years old the family moved to Penistone, where he attended Penistone Grammar School. He graduated from the University College of North Staffordshire in 1960.

Career
He taught at Matlock College of Education. During this teaching stint, he received a master's degree and doctorate from Leicester University, finishing his studies in 1971. Hey's doctoral adviser was W. G. Hoskins. Four years later, he left a research fellowship at Leicester to join the faculty of Sheffield University. In 1992 he became a chair professor and, in 1994, the dean of extramural studies. Hey was president of the British Association for Local History and the British Agricultural History Society, and led the British Record Society as council chair.

Hey's interest in local history led to books on the town of Penistone and city of Sheffield, and also the counties of Yorkshire and Derbyshire. His research into surnames, which grew from local history, determined that many rare names originated in the 13th century, and that most people with such surnames still lived close to the area from where their surname came. Linking genetic studies with surname prevalence indicated that people did not move as much as social scientists thought at the time. On 12 April 2014, Hey delivered a Marc Fitch Lecture on "The Origins and Spread of Derbyshire Surnames."

Personal life
Hey was married in 1970 and had two children. He died in 2016 aged 77.

Selected publications
1996: The Oxford Companion to Local and Family History. Oxford University Press.  (as editor)
1997 (published online 2003): iew/10.1093/acref/9780198600800.001.0001/acref-9780198600800 The Oxford Dictionary of Local and Family History 
1998: A History of Sheffield.  Carnegie Publishing. 
2002: A History of Penistone and District. Wharncliffe Books. 
2003: Journeys in Family History: Exploring Your Past, Finding Your Ancestors,  PRO Publications. 
2005: A History of Yorkshire.  Carnegie Publishing. 
2008: Derbyshire: a History''.  Carnegie Publishing.

References

1938 births
2016 deaths
20th-century English historians
British university and college faculty deans
Alumni of Keele University
Alumni of the University of Leicester
Academics of the University of Sheffield
People from Penistone
People educated at Penistone Grammar School
21st-century English historians
English local historians
Historians of Yorkshire